USCGC Ingham may refer to the following cutters of the United States Revenue Cutter Service:

 , a  schooner which served from 1832 to 1836

See also

 , ships of the same name which served with the United States Coast Guard

Ship names